Michael Lewis Nawrocki (born July 8, 1966) is an American director, animator, writer, lyricist, and voice actor best known as the co-creator of the long-running, Christian video series, VeggieTales where he voiced Larry the Cucumber. He voiced many other main characters on the show, including Jerry Gourd, and Jean-Claude Pea, and other various characters, is the co-founder of Big Idea Entertainment alongside Phil Vischer, and currently serves as the Executive Vice President of the company. He has directed several of their productions, including the award-winning Silly Songs with Larry segments from VeggieTales.

Life and career
Nawrocki originally wanted a career in the medicine field, and studied at St. Paul Bible College (now Crown College) where he met Phil Vischer while serving on a puppet ministry. Nawrocki later enrolled at the University of Illinois-Chicago, and joined Vischer at GRAFx, Nawrocki helped to finance his education by taking a job with Renaissance Video, a video production facility where he gained experience in video production and animation and later worked for Post Effects and Film and Tape Works. 

Nawrocki graduated from UIC in 1992 with a BS in biology and a BA in history.

In 1993, Nawrocki left Film & Tape Works, a company that had purchased GRAFx Studios, and his future in medicine to join Vischer and founded Big Idea Productions. After Big Idea's liquidation in 2003, Nawrocki reactivated the company in 2004.

On September 30, 2008, Big Idea Entertainment appointed Nawrocki to the position of Executive Vice President.

In 2014, DreamWorks Classics, the parent company of Big Idea, signed an exclusive deal with Netflix to produce and distribute VeggieTales in the House. Nawrocki was signed on to continue voicing most of his characters.

Revival of VeggieTales
In March of 2019, Mike's partner Phil Vischer announced on his Twitter that he had re-teamed with Mike at TBN to revive the VeggieTales series. Just like previously, Vischer and Nawrocki would return to voice their characters and also work as writers for the new show.

Awards

Published works
Bob Lends a Helping . . . Hand?  (2003)   (co-author with Cindy Kenney)
Peas and Thank You!  (2003)   (writing as the voice of Larry the Cucumber)
The Pirates Who Don't Do Anything and Me! (2004) (co-author with Karen Poth)

Filmography

References

External links

1966 births
Living people
20th-century evangelicals
21st-century evangelicals
American animated film directors
American animated film producers
American animators
American evangelicals
American male voice actors
American people of Polish descent
Crown College (Minnesota) alumni
Evangelical writers
Male actors from Dayton, Ohio
University of Illinois alumni
Writers from Dayton, Ohio